Fertility is a 1929 German silent film directed by Eberhard Frowein. It was shot at the Terra Studios in Berlin.

Cast
In alphabetical order
 Edward Barby as Dr. Friedrich Witte
 Valeria Blanka as Elinor, seine Frau
 Anny Eberty as Maria Huber
 Paul Henckels as Dr. Paul Märker
 Hanna Hoessrich as Marianne, seine Tochter
 Hans Oberländer as Ein Pfarrer
 Walter Steinbeck as Direktor Roeder

References

Bibliography 
 Ginsberg, Terri & Mensch, Andrea (ed.) A Companion to German Cinema. John Wiley & Sons, 2012.

External links 
 

1929 films
Films of the Weimar Republic
German silent feature films
Films directed by Eberhard Frowein
German black-and-white films
1920s German films
Films shot at Terra Studios